Basil Lionel Smale (25 November 1878 – 22 April 1934) was an Australian rules footballer who played with Melbourne in the Victorian Football League (VFL).

He died in Perth Hospital after being knocked off his bicycle by a motorist.

Notes

External links 

1878 births
Australian rules footballers from Melbourne
Melbourne Football Club players
1934 deaths
People from Brighton, Victoria
Road incident deaths in Australia